The Inkpot Award is an honor bestowed annually since 1974 by Comic-Con International.  It is given to professionals in the fields of comic books, comic strips, animation, science fiction, and related areas of popular culture, at CCI's annual convention, the San Diego Comic-Con. Also eligible are members of Comic-Con's Board of Directors and convention committee.

The recipients, listed below, are known primarily as comics creators, including writers; artists; letterers; colorists; editors; or publishers; unless otherwise noted.

Awards by year
Source: 1974-2007, 1974-2011, 1974-2013

1970s

1974
Forrest J. Ackerman (magazine editor)
Ray Bradbury (prose writer)
Kirk Alyn (actor)
Milton Caniff
Frank Capra (filmmaker)
Bob Clampett (animator)
June Foray (voice actress)
Eric Hoffman (film historian)
Chuck Jones (animator)
Jack Kirby
Stan Lee
Bill Lund / William R. Lund (actor/writer/founding member of San Diego Comic-Con)
Russ Manning
Russell Myers (creator of 'Broom Hilda' comic strip)
Charles Schulz
Phil Seuling (Comic Art Convention founder)
Roy Thomas
Bjo Trimble (science-fiction fandom figure)

1975
Barry Alfonso (writer/founding member of San Diego Comic-Con)
Brad Anderson
Robert Bloch (prose writer)
Vaughn Bodé  (cartoonist)
Edgar Rice Burroughs (prose writer)
Daws Butler (voice actor)
 Richard Butner (Comic-Con Chair-person; no relation to prose writer)
Shel Dorf ('Founding Father' of San Diego Comic-Con)
Will Eisner
Mark Evanier
Gil Kane
 Alan Light
Dick Moores
George Pal (filmmaker)
Rod Serling (screenwriter)
Joe Shuster
Jerry Siegel
Barry Windsor-Smith
Jim Starlin
Jim Steranko
Theodore Sturgeon (prose writer)
Larry "Seymour" Vincent (TV horror-movie host)

1976
Neal Adams
Sergio Aragonés
Mel Blanc (voice actor)
Frank Brunner
Rick Griffin
Johnny Hart
George Clayton Johnson (screenwriter)
Vicky Kelso (long-time Secretary of San Diego Comic-Con)
Mel Lazarus
Sheldon Mayer
Dale Messick
Alex Niño
Don Rico
Don Thompson
Maggie Thompson

1977
Alfredo Alcala
Carl Barks
C. C. Beck
Howard Chaykin
Lester Dent (prose writer)
Jackie Estrada
Hal Foster
Walter "The Shadow" Gibson (prose writer)
Jim Harmon (writer/old radio & movie serial historian)
Robert A. Heinlein (prose writer)
Gene Henderson (San Diego Comic-Con's Historian & Director-at-Large)
Michael Kaluta
Joe Kubert
Harvey Kurtzman
George Lucas (filmmaker)
Stan Lynde
Byron Preiss
Trina Robbins
Stanley Ralph Ross
Bill Scott
David Scroggy
Jay Ward (TV producer)
Len Wein

1978
John Buscema
Al Capp
Gene Colan
Gill Fox
Tom French
Steve Gerber
Chester Gould
Burne Hogarth
Bob Kane
Ken Krueger (founding member of San Diego Comic-Con)
Bernie Lansky
Gray Morrow
Clarence Nash
Grim Natwick
Bill Rotsler
Mike Royer
Gilbert Shelton
Dave Sheridan
Bill Stout
Frank Thorne
Boris Vallejo
Mort Weisinger
Elmer Woggon

1979
Craig Anderson
Steve Englehart
Dale Enzenbacher
Kelly Freas
Virginia French
H. R. Giger (painter)
Gene Hazelton
Carl Macek
Victor Moscoso
Larry Niven (prose writer)
Dan O'Neill
Virgil Partch
Jerry Pournelle
Nestor Redondo
Marshall Rogers
John Romita, Sr.
Bill Spicer
Mort Walker
Marv Wolfman

1980s

1980
Terry Austin
Murray Bishoff
Pat Boyette
John Byrne
National Film Board of Canada
Ernie Chan
Chris Claremont
Shary Flenniken
Mike Friedrich
Rick Geary
Don Glut
S. Gross
Al Hartley
B. Kliban
Jerry Muller
Joe Orlando
Fred Patten
Don Phelps
Richard Pini
Wendy Pini
David Raskin
Scott Shaw
Jim Shooter
John Stanley
B. K. Taylor
Osamu Tezuka
Adam West
Wally Wood

1981
Jerry Bails
L. B. Cole
Jim Fitzpatrick
Dick Giordano
Dave Graue
Paul Gulacy
Mary Henderson 
Karl Hubenthal
Bil Keane
Frank Miller
Doug Moench
Monkey Punch
Dennis O'Neil
Gary Owens
Richard Rockwell
Allen Saunders
Julius Schwartz
Mike Sekowsky
Bill Sienkiewicz
Dave Sim
Alex Toth
Morrie Turner
Bill Woggon

1982
Bob Bindig
Brian Bolland
Russ Cochran
David Cockrum
Max Allan Collins
Chase Craig
Archie Goodwin
Mike Grell
Bruce Hamilton
Jack Katz
Howard Kazanjian
Hank Ketcham
Walter Koenig (actor)
Richard Kyle
Lee Marrs
Frank Marshall
John Pound, artist/founding member of San Diego Comic-Con
Tony Raiola
Steven Spielberg (filmmaker)
Leonard Starr
Robert Williams

1983
Douglas Adams (prose writer)
Maeheah Alzmann
Jim Aparo
Don Bluth
Floyd Gottfredson
Norman Maurer
George Pérez
Arn Saba
Dan Spiegle
Joe Staton
James Van Hise
Cat Yronwode

1984
Murphy Anderson
Román Arámbula
Greg Bear (prose writer/founding member of San Diego Comic-Con)
Fae (Gates) Desmond, Comic-Con Executive Director
Stan Drake
John Field
Rick Hoberg
Greg Jein
Ollie Johnston
Brant Parker
Robert Shayne (actor)
Curt Swan
Frank Thomas
Jim Valentino
Al Williamson

1985
Brent Anderson
Ben Bova (book/magazine editor)
David Brin
Jack Cummings
Jack Davis
Alan Moore
Dan O'Bannon (filmmaker)
Tom Orzechowski
John Rogers
Alex Schomburg
Walt Simonson

1986
Poul Anderson (prose writer)
Marion Zimmer Bradley (prose writer)
Dave Gibbons
Jean "Moebius" Giraud
Gilbert Hernandez
Jaime Hernandez
Denis Kitchen
Steve Leialoha
Marty Nodell
Harvey Pekar
Mark Stadler
Dave Stevens

1987
Steve Ditko
Harlan Ellison (prose writer)
Larry Geeck
Ward Kimball
Deni Loubert
Bill Messner-Loebs
Mike Peters
Bill Schanes
Steve Schanes
Robert Silverberg (prose writer)
Art Spiegelman
Bernie Wrightson
Ray Zone (3-D historian)

1988
Frank Alison, Comic-Con Director-at-Large
Robert Asprin (prose writer)
Mike Baron
Lynda Barry
John Bolton
Jules Feiffer
Raymond Feist (prose writer)
Matt Groening
Gary Groth
George R. R. Martin (prose writer)
Mike Pasqua  (Comic Con Executive Vice President)
Steve Rude
Marie Severin
Matt Wagner

1989
Richard Alf (founding member of San Diego Comic-Con)
R. Crumb
Howard Cruse
Kevin Eastman
Lee Falk
Ron Goulart (prose writer)
Walt Kelly
Peter Laird
Syd Mead (industrial designer)
Andre Norton (prose writer)
Jerry Robinson
Diana Schutz
Janet Tait
Ron Turner
Gahan Wilson

1990s

1990
Karen Berger
Bob Burden
Tom DeFalco
William Gaines
Jim Henson (puppeteer)
Randy and Jean-Marc Lofficier
Grant Morrison
Bob Overstreet
Mary Reynante
Bob Schreck
Ken Steacy
Rick Sternbach (film / television illustrator)
Charles Vess

1991
Alicia Austin
Clive Barker (prose writer)
Dan Barry
Dan DeCarlo
Creig Flessel 
Neil Gaiman
Ted "Dr. Seuss" Geisel
Keith Giffen
George Gladir
Joe Haldeman (prose novelist)
Lynn Johnston
Carol Kalish
Don Maitz
Sheldon Moldoff
Steve Oliff
Julie Roloff
Stan Sakai

1992
Carina Burns-Chenelle, Comic-Con treasurer
Bob Chapman
Francis Ford Coppola (filmmaker)
Robin Doig
Alan Grant
Bill Griffith
Ray Harryhausen (filmmaker)
Marc Hempel
Jim Lee
Milo Manara
Scott McCloud
Todd McFarlane
Rowena Morrill (book/magazine illustrator)
Diane Noomin
Louise Simonson
Dick Sprang
Vernor Vinge (prose writer)
Mark Wheatley

1993
Jim Aparo
Gary Carter (comics historian)
Phil Foglio
Robert Goodwin
Ferd Johnson
Don Martin
Dave McKean
Clydene Nee
Paul Norris
Paul Power
P. Craig Russell
Mark Schultz
Vincent Sullivan
Michael Whelan (artist)
Roger Zelazny (prose writer)

1994
Mike Carlin
Paul Chadwick
Al Feldstein
Stan Goldberg
Roberta Gregory
Chad Grothkopf
Jerry Ordway
Bud Plant
Mike Richardson
John Romita, Jr.
Richard Rowell
Lucius Shepard (prose writer)
Mickey Spillane (prose writer)
J. Michael Straczynski
Rumiko Takahashi

1995
Roger Corman (filmmaker)
Greg Hildebrandt (Brothers Hildebrandt)
Tim Hildebrandt (Brothers Hildebrandt)
Ryoichi Ikegami
Irv Novick
Joe Sinnott

1996
Donna Barr
Mort Drucker
Joe Giella
Jim Mooney
Kurt Schaffenberger
François Schuiten
David Siegel

1997
Dick Ayers
Steve Bissette
Terry Brooks (prose writer)
Bob Haney
Russ Heath
Carol Lay
Michael Moorcock (prose writer)
Janice Tobias
George Tuska

1998
John Broome
Eddie Campbell
Nick Cardy
David Glanzer, Comic-Con Director of Marketing and Publicity
Fred Guardineer
Lorenzo Mattotti
Paul S. Newman
John Severin
Joe Simon
Naoko Takeuchi
Mark Yturralde (filmmaker)

1999
Tom Batiuk
Chuck Cuidera
Samuel R. Delany (prose writer)
Arnold Drake
Sam Glanzman
Larry Gonick
Irwin Hasen
Sue Lord, Comic-Con HR/Guest Relations

2000s

2000
Will Elder
Ric Estrada, sometimes (incorrectly) referred to as Rick Estrada
Phoebe Gloeckner
Beth Holley, Comic-Con VP, Exhibits
Carmine Infantino
Jack Kamen
Ben Katchor
Harry Lampert
Bryan Talbot
Angelo Torres
Lewis Trondheim

2001
Henry Boltinoff
Irwin Donenfeld
Brian and Wendy Froud
Martin Jaquish, Comic-Con Director-at-Large
Joe R. Lansdale
Spider and Jeanne Robinson (prose writers)
Alvin Schwartz
Jeff Smith
Kim Thompson

2002
Eddie Ibrahim, Comic-Con Director of Programming
Frank Jacobs
Jason
Paul Levitz
Bob Lubbers
Bob Oksner
Lew Sayre Schwartz
Hal Sherman
Herb Trimpe
William Woolfolk

2003
Charles Berberian
Frank Bolle
Sal Buscema
John Davenport, Comic-Con Events staff
Philippe Dupuy
Steve Jackson (games manufacturer)
Sid Jacobson
Larry Lieber
Terry Moore
Howard Post

2004
Jack Adler
Tom Gill
Harry Harrison (prose writer)
Bruce Jones
Batton Lash
Mike Mignola
Bill Plympton (animator)
Frank Springer
John Totleben
Mark Hamill

2005
Lee Ames
Sy Barry
 Taerie Bryant, Comic-Con Fandom Services
Bob Bolling
Bob Fujitani
Dexter Taylor

2006
 Peter S. Beagle (Outstanding Achievement in Science Fiction and Fantasy)
Art Clokey (animator)
Luis Dominguez
Basil Gogos
Everett Raymond Kinstler (former comics artist; presidential portrait painter)
Kazuo Koike
 Bill Pittman, Comic-Con VP Operations
Yoshihiro Tatsumi

2007
Allen Bellman
Renée French
Gary Friedrich
Adam Hughes
Miriam Katin
Mel Keefer
Joseph Michael Linsner
David Morrell (prose writer)
Lily Renée Phillips
Mike Ploog
 Mary Sturhann, Comic-Con Secretary
Dan Vado
Mark Verheiden
F. Paul Wilson (prose writer)

2008
Official list
Kyle Baker
Ralph Bakshi (animator)
Mike W. Barr
Ed Brubaker
Kim Deitch
Victor Gorelick
Al Jaffee
Todd Klein (letterer)
Tite Kubo
Noel Neill (actress)
Floyd Norman
Al Plastino
Jeff Watts
Bill Willingham
Connie Willis
Jim Woodring

2009
Official list
Mike Allred
LaFrance Bragg
Nick Cuti
Dwayne McDuffie
Stan Freberg
Terry Gilliam
John Kricfalusi
John Lasseter
Hayao Miyazaki
Patrick Oliphant
Chris Oliveros
Seth
Barry Short
Mike Towry
Ramón Valdiosera
Bob Wayne
Phil Yeh

2010s

2010
Peter Bagge
Brian Michael Bendis
Berkeley Breathed
Kurt Busiek
Dave Dorman
Moto Hagio
Charlaine Harris
Stuart Immonen
Phil Jimenez
Jenette Kahn
Keith Knight
Milo Manara
Andy Manzi
Larry Marder
Tom Palmer
Drew Struzan
James Sturm
Carol Tyler
Anna-Marie Villegas
Al Wiesner

2011
Anina Bennett
Jordi Bernet
Joyce Brabner
Chester Brown
Seymour Chwast
Alan Davis
Dick DeBartolo
Dawn Devine
Tony DeZuniga
Eric Drooker
Joyce Farmer
Tsuneo Gōda
Paul Guinan
John Higgins
Jamal Igle
Peter Kuper
Richard A. Lupoff
Pat Lupoff
Steve Sansweet
Bill Schelly
Steven Spielberg (filmmaker)
Frank Stack
Jeff Walker ("genre consultant")

2012
Charlie Adlard
Bill Amend
Alison Bechdel
Tim Bradstreet
Mike Carey (writer)
Peter Coogan
Geof Darrow
Randy Duncan of Comics Arts Conference
Ben Edlund
Gary Gianni
Larry Hama
Peter F. Hamilton (prose writer)
Mario Hernandez
Klaus Janson
Joe Jusko
Robert Kirkman
Erik Larsen
Rob Liefeld
Andy Mangels
Rudy Nebres
Whilce Portacio
James Robinson
Lou Scheimer
Arnold Schwarzenegger (actor)
Jim Silke
Marc Silvestri
Michael E. Uslan
Trevor Von Eeden
Mark Waid
Thomas Yeates

2013
 Jon Bogdanove
 Alan Campbell
 Gerry Conway
 Denys Cowan
 Michael Davis
 Gene Deitch
 José Delbo
 Derek T. Dingle
 Paul Dini
 Ellen Forney
 Gary Frank
 Tony Isabella
 Dan Jurgens
 Sam Kieth
 Jack Larson
 Elliot S. Maggin
 Leonard Maltin (film critic)
 Jeff Mariotte
 Val Mayerik
 Dean Mullaney
 Martin Pasko
 Fred Perry
 Ruth Sanderson
 Romeo Tanghal
 Bruce Timm

2014
 Ray Billingsley
 June Brigman
 Mark Brooks
 Amanda Conner
 Brian Crane
 Chuck Dixon
 Jane Espenson
 Bill Finger
 Drew Friedman
 Michael T. Gilbert
 Brian Haberlin
 Willie Ito
 Kelley Jones
 Katherine Morrison
 Julie Newmar (actress)
 Graham Nolan
 Michelle Nolan
 Jimmy Palmiotti
 Benoît Peeters
 John Picacio
 Mimi Pond
 Joe Quesada
 Sam Raimi (film director)
 Don Rosa
 Brian Stelfreeze
 Burt Ward (actor)

2015
 Jerry Beck
 Greg Capullo
 Mike Catron
 Carlos Ezquerra
 Andrew Farago
 Dave Garcia
 Tom Grummett
 Jackson Guice
 Chip Kidd
 Steve Lieber
 Laura Martin
 Dave McCaig
 Bill Mumy (actor)
 Kevin Nowlan
 Joe Phillips
 Hilary B. Price
 Humberto Ramos
 Jimmie Robinson
 Luis Royo
 Jen Sorensen
 Richard Starkings
 Kazuki Takahashi
 Jill Thompson
 Jhonen Vasquez
 Craig Yoe

2016
 Jason Aaron
 Derf Backderf
 Michael Barrier (animation historian)
 Luc Besson (film director)
 Peggy Burns
 Peter David
 Jim Davis
 Tom Devlin
 Ben Dunn
 Matt Fraction
 William Gibson (novelist)
 Kieron Gillen
 Mike Judge (animator)
 Hidenori Kusaka
 Ed McGuinness
 Jamie McKelvie
 Tsutomu Nihei
 Christopher Priest
 Phil Roman (animator)
 Alex Sinclair
 John Trimble
 Satoshi Yamamoto

2017
 Andrew Aydin
 Alan Burnett
 Joyce Chin
 Kevin Feige
 Robin Hobb
 John Lewis
 Jeph Loeb
 Jonathan Maberry
 Glenn McCoy
 Keith Pollard
 Nate Powell
 Brian Selznick
 R. Sikoryak
 Alex Simmons
 Gail Simone
 R. L. Stine
 Ron Wilson

2018
 Yoshitaka Amano
 Marc Bernardin
 Cory Doctorow
 Brian Fies
 Richard Friend 
 Alex Grecian
 Deborah Harkness
 Elizabeth Hand
 Larry Houston
 David W. Mack
 Nichelle Nichols 
 Liniers 
 Brian Pulido
 Randy Reynaldo
 Eric Reynolds
 Kevin Smith
 Peter Tomasi
 Shannon Wheeler
 Rafael Albuquerque

2019
 Craig Fellows (Vice President Operations, Board Member, Artist)
 Wendy All
 Leigh Bardugo
 Jon B. Cooke
 Mary Fleener
 Gene Ha
 Jonathan Hickman
 Arvell Jones
 Charlie Kochman
 Craig Miller
 Paco Roca
 Scott Snyder
 Billy Tucci
 Chris Ware
 Maryelizabeth Yturralde

2020s

2022
 Barbara Kesel
 Bill Morrison
 Cecil Castellucci
 Danny Fingeroth
 Dan Slott
 Hidetaka Tenjin
 Jock
 John J. Murakami
 Lilah Sturges
 Marie Javins
 Miriam Libicki
 Phil LaMarr
 Ruth Clampett
 Shaenon K. Garrity
 Steve Niles
 Trino Monero
 Steve Saffel

See also

Alley Award
Bill Finger Award
Eagle Award
Eisner Award
Harvey Award
Kirby Award
National Comics Award
Russ Manning Award
Shazam Award
Winsor McCay Award

Notes

References

Comics awards
Awards established in 1974